The Grand National Alliance, commonly known as the "Alianza Rosada" (Pink Alliance), was a one-time electoral alliance in the Dominican Republic. The alliance was led by the Dominican Revolutionary Party (PRD) and the Social Christian Reformist Party (PRSC). It lost the 16 May 2006 legislative elections.

Outcome
The electoral alliance was led by then-mayor political parties, the PRD (El Partido Blanco - The "White" Party) and the PRSC (El Partido Colorado - The "Reddish" Party), hence it was referred by its own organizers as the Pink Alliance (Pink being a combination of red and white).

After the elections, the poor performance of the PRSC party left it out so bad that it had one more chance (the 2008 Dominican Presidential elections) to keep calling itself a major contemporary political party. Even its former presidential candidate, Eduardo Estrella, was first ousted (through alleged internal ballot bribery) and later left the party before the 2008 elections, on grounds of severe political differences.

After the failed alliance, the PRD and the Dominican Liberation Party (PLD) are left as the de facto major political parties, changing the Dominican Multiple Party system to a Two-Party system.

Defunct political parties in the Dominican Republic
Defunct political party alliances in North America
Political party alliances in the Dominican Republic